Laura Coombs (born 29 January 1991) is an English footballer who plays as a midfielder for Women's Super League club Manchester City and the England national football team. 

A hard-working defensive midfielder, Coombs is described by former teammate Gilly Flaherty as "a real grafter and she'll put in the work that some people don't want to do." She made her senior career debut for Arsenal in 2007. She went on to play for Chelsea and Liverpool before joining Manchester City in 2019.

Coombs made her debut for the senior England women's national football team in October 2015.

Club career
Coombs began playing football aged seven or eight, when she joined a team run by her best friend's father. She progressed to Arsenal's youth academy and began playing in the first team at 16. In September 2009, Coombs made her UEFA Women's Champions League debut in Arsenal's 9–0 win over PAOK Thessaloniki. In summer 2011, Coombs played for American W-League team Los Angeles Strikers, scoring one goal in eight appearances.

During the mid-season break of the inaugural 2011 FA WSL season, Coombs transferred to Chelsea. Chelsea reached the FA Women's Cup final for the first time in 2012, but were eventually beaten by Birmingham City in a penalty shootout after twice taking the lead in a 2–2 draw. In the 2013 mid-season break, Coombs had another stint with LA Strikers. At the 2013 International Women's Club Championship Coombs scored in Chelsea's 3–2 semi-final win over Sydney FC in Okayama, Japan.

In 2015 Chelsea won their first ever major trophy, in the 2015 FA Women's Cup Final at Wembley Stadium. They then beat Sunderland 4–0 in October 2015 to secure the FA WSL title and a League and Cup "double". Teammates noted an improvement in Coombs' strength and power that season, a result of the team's transition from part-time to full-time training.

Coombs announced a season-long loan move to FA WSL rivals Liverpool on 22 December 2015, the same day as Chelsea signed Karen Carney from Birmingham City. During 2017 she eventually signed a two-year deal with the reds.

After three years at the Merseyside club, Coombs, signed in June 2019, for Manchester City on a two-year contract. She went on to win the 2020 FA Cup with City. During May 2021 Coombs signed a two-year extension with Man City. She later triumphed in lifting the 2022 League Cup title with the Citizens.

In the first half of the 2022–23 season, Coombs almost matched her total appearance count for Man City in her previous three seasons with them, having been elevated to a regular starter following the departure of the club's previous starting midfield three; she took on the role of an aggressive centre midfielder.

International career
In July 2009 Coombs featured as England under-19 won the 2009 UEFA Women's Under-19 Championship in Belarus, with a 2–0 final win over Sweden. In 2010 England reached the final of the 2010 UEFA Women's Under-19 Championship in Macedonia, where they lost their title to France. Coombs had been ruled out by injury before the semi-final.

National coach Mark Sampson gave Coombs her first senior call up in October 2015 for the China Cup. She won her first England cap on 23 October 2015, as a substitute in England's 2–1 defeat by China in Yongchuan, also earning a few minutes in another match of the same tournament. In 2020, she was called up for England training camp but did not play.

Having not played for England since 2015, Coombs was named in the squad for the 2023 Arnold Clark Cup after performing well with more regular playing time at Man City. The Offside Rule also said that she offers more age and experience for the attacking half of the England squad. She became the oldest player in the squad and said that, though always wanting to represent her country, she had parked those aspirations after not being called up in so long. She came on as a substitute for former City teammate Georgia Stanway in their first match and started in the next.

Personal life
Coombs graduated from the University of Hertfordshire with a degree in HR and business. She aims to eventually become an entrepreneur as well.

Career statistics

Club

International

Honours
Chelsea
FA WSL: 2015 FA WSL
Women's FA Cup: 2014–15

Manchester City
Women's FA Cup: 2019–20
FA WSL Cup: 2021–22

England
Arnold Clark Cup: 2023

Individual
 PFA WSL Fans' Player of the Month: December 2022

References

External links
 
 Laura Coombs at Chelsea FC
 Laura Coombs profile at the Football Association

1991 births
Living people
English women's footballers
England women's international footballers
England women's under-23 international footballers
FA Women's National League players
Women's Super League players
Arsenal W.F.C. players
Chelsea F.C. Women players
Liverpool F.C. Women players
Barnet F.C. Ladies players
Manchester City W.F.C. players
Sportspeople from Gravesend, Kent
USL W-League (1995–2015) players
Expatriate women's soccer players in the United States
English expatriate women's footballers
English expatriate sportspeople in the United States
Alumni of the University of Hertfordshire
Women's association football midfielders
Nottingham Forest Women F.C. players
Los Angeles Strikers players